William Dowdeswell  may refer to:
 William Dowdeswell (sheriff, died 1683) (died 1683), Sheriff of Worcestershire, 1678
 William Dowdeswell (politician, born 1682) (1682–1728), MP for Tewkesbury, 1712–1722
 William Dowdeswell (politician, born 1721) (1721–1775), British politician, Chancellor of the Exchequer, 1765–1766, son of the above
 William Dowdeswell (British Army officer) (1760–1828), British Army general, MP for Tewkesbury, 1792–1797, Governor of the Bahamas, 1797–1801, son of the above
 William Dowdeswell (politician, born 1804) (1804–1870), Conservative MP for Tewkesbury, 1835–1847
 William Dowdeswell (politician, born 1841) (1841–1893), Conservative MP for Tewkesbury, 1865–1866, and West Worcestershire, 1866–1876, son of the above